Days of the Bagnold Summer is a 2019 British coming-of-age comedy-drama film directed by Simon Bird, starring Monica Dolan, Earl Cave, Rob Brydon, Tamsin Greig, and Tim Key, with a musical score by Belle and Sebastian. The film was based on the 2012 graphic novel of the same name by Joff Winterhart, adapted for the screen by Bird’s wife Lisa Owens.

The film premiered at the 2019 Locarno Film Festival. The site's critical consensus reads, "Days of the Bagnold Summer draws on well-rounded performances from its leads to fill in the familiar outlines of its coming-of-age story with gentle humor and tender insight."

References

External links 
 
 
 

2019 films
2019 comedy-drama films
British comedy-drama films
Heavy metal films
2010s English-language films
2010s British films